Acidocroton verrucosus is a species of plant in the family Euphorbiaceae. It is endemic to Jamaica.

References

Codiaeae
Vulnerable plants
Endemic flora of Jamaica
Taxonomy articles created by Polbot